Laura Antonelli ( Antonaz; 28 November 1941 – 22 June 2015) was an Italian film actress who appeared in 45 films between 1964 and 1991.

Early years 
Antonelli was born Laura Antonaz in Pola, Kingdom of Italy (in Croatian, Pula), former capital of Istria. After the war, her parents fled what was then Yugoslavia, lived in Italian refugee camps and eventually settled in Naples, where her father found work as a hospital administrator. Antonelli had a childhood interest in mathematics, but as a teenager, she became proficient at gymnastics. In an interview for The New York Times, she recalled, "My parents had made me take hours of gym classes during my teens ... They felt I was ugly, clumsy, insignificant and they hoped I would at least develop some grace. I became very good, especially in rhythmical gym, which is a kind of dance."

Setting aside ambitions to make a career in mathematics, she graduated as a gymnastics instructor. She moved to Rome, where she became a secondary-school gym teacher and was able to meet people in the entertainment industry, who helped her find modelling jobs.

Career 
Antonelli's earliest engagements included Italian advertisements for Coca-Cola. In 1965, she made her first feature-film appearance in Le sedicenni, although her performance went uncredited. Her American debut came in 1966 in Dr. Goldfoot and the Girl Bombs. Other roles followed; her breakthrough came in 1973's Malizia. She appeared in a number of sex farces such as Till Marriage Do Us Part/Mio Dio come sono caduta in basso!.

She worked in more serious films, as well, including Luchino Visconti's last film, The Innocent (1976). In Wifemistress, a romance film of 1977, she played a repressed wife experiencing a sexual awakening. Later, she appeared in Passione d'Amore (1981). From 1986 she mostly worked on Italian television series. Antonelli's final film role was in the sequel Malizia 2000 (1991), following which she retired. She won the Italian National Syndicate of Film Journalists Award, Nastro d'Argento, in 1974 for Malizia.

Personal life 
Antonelli was married to publisher Enrico Piacentini but they divorced. From 1972 to 1980, she was the companion of actor Jean-Paul Belmondo.

On 27 April 1991, cocaine was found during a police raid on Antonelli's home. She was subsequently convicted of possession and dealing and sentenced to house arrest. She spent ten years appealing the conviction, which was eventually overturned. In 2006, the Italian court of appeals ruled in favor of Antonelli and ordered the Ministry of Justice to pay the actress 108,000 euros.

Antonelli died in Ladispoli on 22 June 2015, aged 73, from a heart attack.

Filmography

TV appearances 
  (1988) (miniseries) as Lisa
 Disperatamente Giulia (1989) (miniseries) as Carmen Milkovich

References

External links 

 
 

1941 births
2015 deaths
Istrian Italian people
People from Pula
Italian film actresses
20th-century Italian actresses
Nastro d'Argento winners
Italian television actresses